Transport in Mexico City consists of a variety modes, including the roads, the Mexico City Metro, extensive bus and bus rapid transit systems (the Metrobús, RTP, and the trolleybus), as well as the Xochimilco Light Rail and cable cars. The city is serviced by the Benito Juárez International Airport which is supported by the Toluca and Zumpango airports, both in the neighboring State of Mexico. Additionally, like other cities around the world, Mexico City has public taxis, public buses and share taxis and rickshaws. Trajineras,  gondola-like boats, service the Xochimilco Lake area. Previously, the city used to operate streetcars. The Greater Mexico City area has additional routes that provide services to the city, including the Tren Suburbano commuter railway, the Mexibús BRT network, and the Mexicable aerial lift system. The transport services are operated by public or private entities but all of them are regulated in the city by the Secretaría de Movilidad (SEMOVI; Secretary of Mobility). 

Despite the multiple public transport options, private cars are still widely used throughout the metropolitan area estimated at more than 4.5 million in 2016. Further, motorized public transportation is rated as bad and unsafe by its users, specifically for the high incidence of assaults and robberies as well as harassment, abuse, and sexual harassment of women. The systems are also considered by the users as inefficient, ineffective, and face problems such as the lack of regulation and official supervision.

Buses

Bus rapid transit

The city's first bus rapid transit line, the Metrobús, began operation in June 2005, along Avenida Insurgentes. More and more lines opened and as of mid-2017 there are 6 routes with a 7th planned along Paseo de la Reforma to connect Santa Fe with the city center and points north. As each line opened, the 'pesero' minibuses were removed from each route, in order to reduce pollution and commute times. As of mid-2017, there were 568 Metrobús buses. In late 2016 they transported an average of 1.1 million passengers daily. Mexibús provides 4 bus rapid transit lines connecting Metro Ciudad Azteca and Metro Pantitlán with Cuautitlán, Ecatepec and other suburban areas in the State of Mexico.

Public buses

The peseros are typically half-length passenger buses (known as microbús) that sit 22 passengers and stand up to 28. , the approximately 28,000 peseros carried up to 60 percent of the city's passengers. In August 2016, Mayor Mancera announced that new pesero vehicle and concessions would be eliminated unless they were ecologically friendly vehicles, and in October 2011 the city's Secretary of Mobility Héctor Serrano states that by the end of the current administration (2018) there would no longer by any peseros/microbuses circulating at all, and that new full-sized buses would take over the routes.

In 2014, the city launched so-called "Bus Rapid Service", with mid-sized Mercedes-Benz Boxer buses carrying 75–85 passengers painted purple-on-white, replacing 'peseros' on certain groups of routes. Operation is a concession to the private firms (SAUSA, COTOBUSA, TREPSA) instead of to individual vehicle operators.

City agency Red de Transporte de Pasajeros (RTP), formerly M1, operates various networks of large buses including regular, Ecobús, Circuito Bicentenario, Atenea, Express, school and night routes. In 2016, more bus routes were added to replace pesero routes. In 2016, the SVBUS express bus service was launched, with limited stops and utilizing the city's toll roads on the second-level of the Periférico ring road and Supervía Poniente and connecting Toreo/Cuatro Caminos with Santa Fe, San Jerónimo Lídice and Tepepan near Xochimilco in the southeast. Suburban buses also leave from the city's main intercity bus stations.

Trolleybuses

Cable cars

Metro

Mexico City is served by the Sistema de Transporte Colectivo, a  metro system, which is the largest in Latin America. The first portions were opened in 1969 and it has expanded to 12 lines with 195 stations. The metro transports 4.4 million people every day. It is the 8th busiest metro system in the world, behind Tokyo (10.0 million), Beijing (9.3 million), Shanghai (7.8 million), Seoul (7.3 million), Moscow (6.7 million), Guangzhou (6.2 million), and New York City (4.9 million). It is heavily subsidized, and has some of the lowest fares in the world, each trip costing 5.00 pesos (roughly US$0.27) from 05:00 am to midnight. Several stations display pre-Columbian artifacts and architecture that were discovered during the metro's construction.  However, the metro covers less than half of the total urban area. The Metro stations are also differentiated by the use of icons and glyphs which were created for the illiterate, a unique system that has become iconic characteristic of Mexico City. Each icon was developed based on historical (characters, sites, pre-Hispanic motifs), linguistic, symbolic (glyphs) or geographic references. A complementary system of icons was used for the Metrobús (BRT) stops.

Commuter rail

Tren Suburbano

A suburban commuter rail system, the Tren Suburbano serves the metropolitan area, beyond the reach of the metro, with only one line serving to municipalities such as Tlalnepantla and Cuautitlán Izcalli, but with future lines planned to serve e.g. Chalco and La Paz.

Light rail

The Xochimilco Light Rail is a light rail system operated by Servicio de Transportes Eléctricos.

Cycling

The local government continuously strives for a reduction of massive traffic congestion, and has increased incentives for making a bicycle-friendly city. This includes Muévete en Bici and North America's second-largest bicycle sharing system, Ecobici, launched in 2010, in which registered residents can get bicycles for 45 minutes with a pre-paid subscription of 300 pesos a year. There are, as of September 2013, 276 stations with 4,000 bicycles across an area stretching from the Historic center to Polanco. within  of one another and are fully automatic using a transponder based card. Bicycle-service users have access to several permanent Ciclovías (dedicated bike paths/lanes/streets), including ones along Paseo de la Reforma and Avenida Chapultepec as well as one running  from Polanco to Fierro del Toro, which is located south of Cumbres del Ajusco National Park, near the Morelos state line. The city's initiative is inspired by forward thinking examples, such as Denmark's Copenhagenization.

Roads

Greater Mexico City is connected through a private network of toll expressways to the nearby cities of Querétaro, Toluca, Cuernavaca, Pachuca and Puebla. Ring roads are the Circuito Interior (inner ring), Anillo Periférico; the Circuito Exterior Mexiquense ("State of Mexico outer loop") toll road skirting the northeastern and eastern edges of the metropolitan area, the Chamapa-La Venta toll road skirting the northwestern edge, and the Arco Norte completely bypassing the metropolitan area in an arc from west (Toluca) to north (Tula) to east (Puebla). A second level (where tolls are charged) of the Periférico, colloquially called the segundo piso ("second floor"), was officially opened in 2012, with sections still being completed. The Viaducto Miguel Alemán crosses the city east–west from Observatorio to the airport. In 2013 the Supervía Poniente opened, a toll road linking the new Santa Fe business district with southwestern Mexico City. Inside the city, ejes viales; high-volume, mostly one-way roads, cross the city from side to side in a vast numbered system.

In the late 1970s many arterial roads were redesigned as ejes viales; high-volume one-way roads that cross, in theory, Mexico City proper from side to side. The eje vial network is based on a quasi-Cartesian grid, with the ejes themselves being called Eje 1 Poniente, Eje Central, and Eje 1 Oriente, for example, for the north–south roads, and Eje 2 Sur and Eje 3 Norte, for example, for east–west roads. Ring roads are the Circuito Interior (inner ring), Anillo Periférico; the Circuito Exterior Mexiquense ("State of Mexico outer loop") toll road skirting the northeastern and eastern edges of the metropolitan area, the Chamapa-La Venta toll road skirting the northwestern edge, and the Arco Norte completely bypassing the metropolitan area in an arc from northwest (Atlacomulco) to north (Tula, Hidalgo) to east (Puebla). A second level (where tolls are charged) of the Periférico, colloquially called the segundo piso ("second floor"), was officially opened in 2012, with sections still being completed. The Viaducto Miguel Alemán crosses the city east–west from Observatorio to the airport. In 2013 the Supervía Poniente opened, a toll road linking the new Santa Fe business district with southwestern Mexico City.

There is an environmental program, called Hoy No Circula ("Today Does Not Run", or "One Day without a Car"), whereby vehicles that have not passed emissions testing are restricted from circulating on certain days according to the ending digit of their license plates; this in an attempt to cut down on pollution and traffic congestion. While in 2003, the program still restricted 40% of vehicles in the metropolitan area, with the adoption of stricter emissions standards in 2001 and 2006, in practice, these days most vehicles are exempt from the circulation restrictions as long as they pass regular emissions tests.

Parking

Street parking in urban neighborhoods is mostly controlled by the franeleros a.k.a. "viene vienes" (lit. "come on, come on"), who ask drivers for a fee to park. Double parking is common (with franeleros moving the cars as required), impeding on the available lanes for traffic to pass. In order to mitigate that and other problems and to raise revenue, 721 parking meters (as of October 2013), have been installed in the west-central neighborhoods Lomas de Chapultepec, Condesa, Roma, Polanco and Anzures, in operation from 8 AM to 8 PM on weekdays and charging a rate of 2 pesos per 15 minutes, with offenders' cars booted, costing about 500 pesos to remove. 30 percent of the monthly 16 million-peso (as of October 2013) income from the parking-meter system (named "ecoParq") is earmarked for neighborhood improvements. The granting of the license for all zones exclusively to a new company without experience in operating parking meters, Operadora de Estacionamientos Bicentenario, has generated controversy.

Airports

Mexico City International Airport is Mexico City's primary airport (IATA Airport Code: MEX). It is the busiest airport in Latin America with regular (daily) flights to North America, mainland Mexico, Central America and the Caribbean, South America, Europe and Asia. In 2019, it was used by over 50 million passengers. The traffic exceeds the current capacity of the airport, which has historically centralized the majority of air traffic in the country. Aeroméxico (Skyteam) is based at this airport, and has codeshare agreements with non-Mexican airlines that span the entire globe. The airport is also a hub for Volaris, VivaAerobus and Aeromar. It was a hub for Mexicana de Aviacion and Interjet in the past. Mexico City International Airport has two terminals, which are serviced by the Aerotrén, a self-driving people mover system.

Felipe Ángeles International Airport (IATA Airport Code: NLU) is Mexico City's secondary airport. The airport opened in 2022, rebuilt from the former Santa Lucía Air Force Base.

Other airports include the neighboring airports at Toluca, State of Mexico (IATA: TLC), Zumpango, State of Mexico (IATA: NLU), Querétaro City, Querétaro (IATA: QRO), Puebla City, Puebla (IATA: PBC), and Cuernavaca, Morelos (IATA: CVJ).

See also
 Mexico City
 Hoy No Circula
 Rickshaws in Mexico City
 Streetcars in Mexico City
 Trajineras

References

External links

Transportation in Mexico City
Mexico City